The Leaning Tower of Pizza was a proposed 30-story slanted skyscraper that would have housed Domino's Pizza's operations at its Domino's Farms campus near Ann Arbor, Michigan.

Design 
In the mid-1980s, Domino’s Pizza mogul Tom Monaghan asked Taliesin Associated Architects, the inheritors of Frank Lloyd Wright's practice, to erect a structure based on an un-built tower that Wright designed in 1956 for Chicago called the Golden Beacon. Sometime during the planning of the tower, Monaghan and the Taliesin architects parted company, allegedly because both parties felt the project may have not served justice to the spirit of Wright’s architecture. 
Mr. Monaghan then went to Gunnar Birkerts, the architect of Domino’s unusual half-mile (800 m) long headquarters office building who came up with a design for a tower that would rise at a 15-degree angle with a swooping top reminiscent of the forms of Wright's late work. Birkerts’ design, no doubt, had serious intent, but would immediately and forever be dubbed with the nickname “The Leaning Tower of Pizza" after Italy's Leaning Tower of Pisa.

References 

Domino's Pizza
Unbuilt buildings and structures in the United States
Proposed skyscrapers in the United States
Culture of Ann Arbor, Michigan
Inclined towers in the United States